In particle physics, the W and Z bosons are vector bosons that are together known as the weak bosons or more generally as the intermediate vector bosons. The  bosons have either a positive or negative electric charge of 1 elementary charge and are each other's antiparticles. The  boson is electrically neutral and is its own antiparticle. The three particles each have a spin of 1. The  bosons have a magnetic moment, but the  has none. Their experimental discovery was pivotal in establishing what is now called the Standard Model of particle physics.

The  bosons are named after the weak force. The physicist Steven Weinberg named the additional particle the " particle", and later gave the explanation that it was the last additional particle needed by the model. The  bosons had already been named, and the  bosons were named for having zero electric charge.

The two  bosons are verified mediators of neutrino absorption and emission. During these processes, the  boson charge induces electron or positron emission or absorption, thus causing nuclear transmutation.

The  boson mediates the transfer of momentum, spin and energy when neutrinos scatter elastically from matter (a process which conserves charge). Such behavior is almost as common as inelastic neutrino interactions and may be observed in bubble chambers upon irradiation with neutrino beams. The  boson is not involved in the absorption or emission of electrons or positrons. Whenever an electron is observed as a new free particle, suddenly moving with kinetic energy, it is inferred to be a result of a neutrino interacting with the electron (with the momentum transfer via the Z boson) since this behavior happens more often when the neutrino beam is present. In this process, the neutrino simply strikes the electron (via exchange of a boson) and then scatters away from it, transferring some of the neutrino's momentum to the electron.

Basic properties 
These bosons are among the heavyweights of the elementary particles.

Their high masses limit the range of the weak interaction. By way of contrast, the photon is the force carrier of the electromagnetic force and has zero mass, consistent with the infinite range of electromagnetism; the hypothetical graviton is also expected to have zero mass. (Although gluons are also presumed to have zero mass, the range of the color force is limited for different reasons; see color confinement.)

All three bosons have particle spin s = 1. At the same time, the emission or absorption of a  boson can change the type of the particle – for example changing a strange quark into an up quark. The neutral Z boson cannot change the electric charge of any particle, nor can it change any other of the so-called "charges" (such as strangeness, baryon number, charm, etc.). The emission or absorption of a  boson can only change the spin, momentum, and energy of the other particle. (See also Weak neutral current.)

Relations to the weak nuclear force 

The  and  bosons are carrier particles that mediate the weak nuclear force, much as the photon is the carrier particle for the electromagnetic force.

W bosons
The  bosons are best known for their role in nuclear decay. Consider, for example, the beta decay of cobalt-60.

  → + + 

This reaction does not involve the whole cobalt-60 nucleus, but affects only one of its 33 neutrons. The neutron is converted into a proton while also emitting an electron (called a beta particle in this context) and an electron antineutrino:

 

Again, the neutron is not an elementary particle but a composite of an up quark and two down quarks. It is in fact one of the down quarks that interacts in beta decay, turning into an up quark to form a proton. At the most fundamental level, then, the weak force changes the flavour of a single quark:

  

which is immediately followed by decay of the  itself:

Z bosons

The  is its own antiparticle. Thus, all of its flavour quantum numbers and charges are zero. The exchange of a  boson between particles, called a neutral current interaction, therefore leaves the interacting particles unaffected, except for a transfer of spin and/or momentum.
 boson interactions involving neutrinos have distinct signatures: They provide the only known mechanism for elastic scattering of neutrinos in matter; neutrinos are almost as likely to scatter elastically (via  boson exchange) as inelastically (via W boson exchange). Weak neutral currents via  boson exchange were confirmed shortly thereafter (also in 1973), in a neutrino experiment in the Gargamelle bubble chamber at CERN.

Predictions of the W, W and Z bosons 

Following the success of quantum electrodynamics in the 1950s, attempts were undertaken to formulate a similar theory of the weak nuclear force. This culminated around 1968 in a unified theory of electromagnetism and weak interactions by Sheldon Glashow, Steven Weinberg, and Abdus Salam, for which they shared the 1979 Nobel Prize in Physics. Their electroweak theory postulated not only the  bosons necessary to explain beta decay, but also a new  boson that had never been observed.

These particles are accurately described by an SU(2) gauge theory, but the bosons in a gauge theory must be massless. As a case in point, the photon is massless because electromagnetism is described by a U(1) gauge theory. The Higgs mechanism, first put forward by the 1964 PRL symmetry breaking papers, fulfills this role. It requires the existence of another particle, the Higgs boson, which has since been found at the Large Hadron Collider.

The combination of the SU(2) gauge theory of the weak interaction, the electromagnetic interaction, and the Higgs mechanism is known as the Glashow–Weinberg–Salam model. Today it is widely accepted as one of the pillars of the Standard Model of particle physics, particularly given the 2012 discovery of the Higgs boson by the CMS and ATLAS experiments.

The model predicts that  and  bosons have the following masses:

Discovery 

Unlike beta decay, the observation of neutral current interactions that involve particles  requires huge investments in particle accelerators and detectors, such as are available in only a few high-energy physics laboratories in the world (and then only after 1983). This is because  bosons behave in somewhat the same manner as photons, but do not become important until the energy of the interaction is comparable with the relatively huge mass of the  boson.

First, in 1973, came the observation of neutral current interactions as predicted by electroweak theory. The huge Gargamelle bubble chamber photographed the tracks of a few electrons suddenly starting to move, seemingly of their own accord. This is interpreted as a neutrino interacting with the electron by the exchange of an unseen  boson. The neutrino is otherwise undetectable, so the only observable effect is the momentum imparted to the electron by the interaction.

The first such machine that became available was the Super Proton Synchrotron, where unambiguous signals of W bosons were seen in January 1983 during a series of experiments made possible by Carlo Rubbia and Simon van der Meer. The actual experiments were called UA1 (led by Rubbia) and UA2 (led by Pierre Darriulat), and were the collaborative effort of many people. Van der Meer was the driving force on the accelerator end (stochastic cooling). UA1 and UA2 found the  boson a few months later, in May 1983. Rubbia and van der Meer were promptly awarded the 1984 Nobel Prize in Physics, a most unusual step for the conservative Nobel Foundation.

The  and  bosons, together with the photon, comprise the four gauge bosons of the electroweak interaction.

2022 unexpected measurement of W boson mass 

Before 2022, measurements of the W boson mass appeared to be consistent with the Standard Model. For example, in 2021, experimental measurements of the W boson mass were assessed to converge around 80,379 ± 12 MeV.

However, in April 2022, a new analysis of data that was obtained by the Fermilab Tevatron collider before its closure in 2011 determined the mass of the W boson to be 80,433 ± 9 MeV, which is seven standard deviations above that predicted by the Standard Model, meaning that if the model is correct there should only be a one-trillionth chance that such a large mass would arise by non-systematic observational error. According to Ashutosh Kotwal of Duke University and the leader of the Collider Detector at Fermilab collaboration, the lower beam luminosity used reduced the chance that events of interest would be obscured by other collisions and that the use of proton-antiproton collisions simplifies the process of quark-antiquark annihilation, which then decayed to give a lepton and a neutrino. The team deliberately encrypted its data and withheld any preliminary results from themselves until the analysis was complete, to prevent "confirmation bias" bending their interpretation of the data. Kotwal described it as the 'largest crack in this beautiful theory', speculating that it might be the 'first clear evidence' of other forces or particles not accounted for by the Standard Model, and which might be accounted for by theories such as supersymmetry. The Nobel-winning theoretical physicist Frank Wilczek described the result as a 'monumental piece of work'.

Besides being inconsistent with the Standard Model, the new measurement is also inconsistent with previous measurements such as ATLAS. This suggests that either the old or the new measurements, despite all precautions, have an unexpected systematic error, such as an undetected quirk in the equipment. Future experiments with the LHC may help determine which set of measurements, if either, are the correct ones. Fermilab Deputy Director Joseph Lykken reiterated that "...the (new) measurement needs to be confirmed by another experiment before it can be interpreted fully." Matthias Schott, of the University of Mainz, commented that "I do not think we have to discuss which new physics could explain the discrepancy between CDF[Collider Detector at Fermilab] and the Standard Model – we first have to understand why the CDF measurement is in strong tension with all [other measurements]".

Decay 
The  and  bosons decay to fermion pairs but neither the  nor the  bosons have sufficient energy to decay into the highest-mass top quark. Neglecting phase space effects and higher order corrections, simple estimates of their branching fractions can be calculated from the coupling constants.

W bosons 
 bosons can decay to a lepton and antilepton (one of them charged and another neutral) or to a quark and antiquark of complementary types (with opposite electric charges  and ). The decay width of the W boson to a quark–antiquark pair is proportional to the corresponding squared CKM matrix element and the number of quark colours,  The decay widths for the W boson are then proportional to:
{| class="wikitable" style="text-align:center;"
!colspan="2" width="100"|Leptons
!colspan="6" width="100"|Quarks
|-
| 
| 1
| 
| 3 
| 
| 3 
| 
| 3 
|-
| 
| 1
| 
| 3 
| 
| 3 
| 
| 3 
|-
| 
| 1
|colspan="6"|Energy conservation forbids decay to  .
|-
|}

Here,  denote the three flavours of leptons (more exactly, the positive charged antileptons). The various  denote the corresponding CKM matrix coefficients.

Unitarity of the CKM matrix implies that

 thus each of two quark rows  Therefore, the leptonic branching ratios of the W boson are approximately   The hadronic branching ratio is dominated by the CKM-favored  and  final states. The sum of the hadronic branching ratios has been measured experimentally to be , with

boson 

 bosons decay into a fermion and its antiparticle. Because the weak isospin  is different for fermions of different chirality, either left-handed or right-handed, the coupling is different as well.

The relative strengths of each coupling can be estimated by considering that the decay rates include the square of these factors, and all possible diagrams (e.g. sum over quark families, and left and right contributions). The results tabulated below are just estimates, since they only include tree-level interaction diagrams in the Fermi theory.

{| class="wikitable" style="text-align:center;"
!colspan=2| Particles
!colspan=2| Weak isospin 
!rowspan=2| Relative factor
!colspan=2| Branching ratio
|-
! Name
! Symbols
! 
! 
! Predicted for  = 0.23
! Experimental measurements
|-
| align="left" | Neutrinos (all)
| 
| 
| 0 
| 
| 
| 
|-
| align="left" | Charged leptons (all)
| 
|colspan=2| 
| 
| 
| 
|-
| align="right" | Electron
| 
| 
| 
| 
| 
| 
|-
| align="right" | Muon
| 
| − + 
| 
| 
| 
| 
|-
| align="right" | Tau
| 
| 
| 
| 
| 
| 
|-
| align="left" | Hadrons
|colspan=4|
| 
| 
|-
| align="right" | Down-type quarks
| 
| 
| 
| 
| 
| 
|-
| align="right" | Up-type quarks( ) 
| 
|  − 
| −
| 
| 
| 
|}
To keep the notation compact, the table uses 

* The impossible decay into a top quark-antiquark pair is left out of the table.

Subheadings  and  denote the chirality or "handedness" of the fermions.

In 2018, the CMS collaboration observed the first exclusive decay of the  boson to a  meson and a lepton-antilepton pair.

See also 
 
 List of particles
 
 Weak charge
 
 : analogous pair of bosons predicted by the Grand Unified Theory

Footnotes

References

External links

 The Review of Particle Physics, the ultimate source of information on particle properties.
 The W and Z particles: a personal recollection by Pierre Darriulat
 When CERN saw the end of the alphabet by Daniel Denegri
 W and Z particles at Hyperphysics

Bosons
Elementary particles
Electroweak theory
Gauge bosons
Standard Model
Force carriers
Subatomic particles with spin 1

de:W-Boson